The Men's individual large hill competition at the FIS Nordic World Ski Championships 2023 was held on 2 and 3 March 2023.

Qualification
The qualification was held on 2 March at 17:30.

Final
The first round was started on 3 March at 17:30 and the final round at 18:38.

References

Men's individual large hill